Eric Woelfl (born July 18, 1989) is a Canadian rower. He won a gold medal at the 2015 Pan American Games in the men's lightweight coxless four event.

In June 2016, he was officially named to Canada's 2016 Olympic team.

References

External links
 

1989 births
Living people
Rowers at the 2015 Pan American Games
Pan American Games gold medalists for Canada
Canadian male rowers
Rowers from St. Catharines
Rowers at the 2016 Summer Olympics
Olympic rowers of Canada
Pan American Games medalists in rowing
Medalists at the 2015 Pan American Games